George Andrew Bristow (25 June 1933 – 3 January 2010) was an English professional footballer who played as a right half in the Football League for Brentford. He made over 260 appearances in all competitions and was posthumously inducted into the Brentford Hall of Fame in May 2015.

Career

Brentford 
A right half, Bristow joined Brentford at a young age and came through the youth ranks to make his debut at the age of 17 in a 4–0 Second Division defeat to Manchester City on 14 October 1950. During his National Service, Bristow turned down a move to follow former teammate Peter Broadbent to First Division club Wolverhampton Wanderers. After completing his National Service and a period as a guest with Dorset League club Blandford United, it wasn't until the 1953–54 season that Bristow was able to hold down a regular first team place and he made 27 appearances in a campaign which saw the Bees relegated to the Third Division South. In February 1956, Bristow was awarded a testimonial versus an International Managers XI and was the club's youngest player to be granted the honour.

Bristow's best years at Brentford came in the 1957–58 and 1958–59 seasons and he made over 40 appearances in each. Injuries took their toll on Bristow and he departed the club at the end of the 1960–61 season, after making 264 appearances for the club and scoring eight goals. He was posthumously inducted into the Brentford Hall of Fame in May 2015.

Queens Park Rangers 
Bristow and Brentford teammates Jim Towers and George Francis joined Brentford's West London rivals Queens Park Rangers during the 1961 off-season. He suffered an achilles injury during a pre-season match, which ended his professional career. Bristow failed to appear for the first team and left the club at the end of the 1961–62 Third Division season.

Yiewsley 
After his release from Queens Park Rangers, Bristow dropped into non-League football and joined Southern League First Division club Yiewsley in 1962.

Personal life 
Bristow undertook his National Service as a PT instructor at Blandford Camp and represented his battalion's football team. He was married to Maureen and had two daughters. After his retirement from football, Bristow worked as a driving instructor, at Heathrow Airport and as of April 1995, he had worked as a self-employed bricklayer for the previous 25 years. He died in January 2010, after suffering with Parkinson's and Alzheimer's diseases.

Career statistics

Honours 
 Brentford Hall of Fame

References

1933 births
Footballers from Chiswick
English footballers
Brentford F.C. players
English Football League players
2010 deaths
Queens Park Rangers F.C. players
Hillingdon Borough F.C. players
Southern Football League players
Association football wing halves
Blandford United F.C. players
Deaths from Parkinson's disease
Deaths from Alzheimer's disease
Deaths from dementia in England
Neurological disease deaths in England